BioGnost Ltd. is a Croatian pharmaceutical company with its headquarters located in Zagreb. The company was founded in 1990 by mr. sc. Ivan Marchiotti, MD and Mirjana Marchiotti-Ulip, MPharm.

The company is a market leader in manufacturing immunohematologic, immunochromatographic, and histologic in vitro diagnostic products in the region of Southeastern Europe.

Company history 
1997 - The Croatian Ministry of Health granted BioGnost the License for manufacture of medical products, the company started manufacturing blood typing serums; first stamp (BIOGNOST) was registered and trademarked with the Croatian Intellectual Property Office. The company soon started manufacturing tests for detecting pregnancy, drug metabolites and infective diseases.

1998 - First distributions with foreign partners were arranged.

2000 - The company began distributing tests for detecting metabolites of drugs. AbuGnost and DOA MultiGnost home tests were being used more often. That can be attributed to numerous newspaper articles and interviews given by mr. sc. Ivan Marchiotti, MD.

2003 - The company implemented the ISO 9001 quality management standard. The process of marketing over 240 registered brand name products was started, and a company representative office was opened in Belgrade, Serbia.

2005 - BioGnost became the first company in Croatia to implement the ISO 13485 standard.

2006 - By implementing the system of protecting the work environment from harmful influence of alcohol and illegal drugs, BioGnost becomes the first company in Croatia to do so. It was also one of the exhibiting companies at the 34th International medical, pharmaceutical, laboratory and rehabilitation equipment, optics and dental equipment fair.

2007 - National Colorectal Cancer Screening Program was launched by distributing HemoGnost tests. The cooperation continues onward.

2010 - 18 brand name products stamps were registered. Sister company BioGnost S was founded.

2011 - BioGnost BH was founded in Sarajevo, Bosnia and Herzegovina.

2012 - The company’s headquarters were moved from Center for Small Business Savica Šanci (Ulica Savica 147) to the new commercial building at the present location (Medjugorska 59). A new sales range Diabetes was launched.

2013 - For the first time the company participated at the renowned Medica Fair in Düsseldorf. That resulted in the rising number of new business cooperations with foreign partners.

Awards and recognitions 
 Croatian Kuna award – 2000, 2002
 Golden Kuna award – 2003. The most successful company in Zagreb in the category of small-sized companies
 The best small Croatian business enterprise – 2004. Awarded by the Ministry of Economy
 ARCA 2004 – Gold medal for diagnostic devices
 3rd European Day of the Entrepreneur 2006 (EDE) – 3rd most promising company among 150 small and medium-sized companies

Sources 

Manufacturing companies based in Zagreb
Pharmaceutical companies of Croatia
Pharmaceutical companies established in 1990
Croatian brands
Croatian companies established in 1990